Rodney Barker is a British academic and political commentator. He was Professor of Government at the  London School of Economics and Political Science and was Professor of Rhetoric at Gresham College in London from September 2006 to September 2009. He is married to the medical sociologist Helen Roberts.

After gaining his BA in History from Downing College, Cambridge, he undertook a PhD at the London School of Economics and Political Science, jointly supervised by Richard Titmuss in the Department of Social Administration, and Robert McKenzie in the Department of Sociology. His first full academic position was as a lecturer in Politics in the Department of Political Theory and Government of University College Swansea, a position he held between 1967 and 1971. After that, he returned to the London School of Economics and Political Science in 1971 and has held the positions of Lecturer, Senior Lecturer, Reader and Professor of Government. He was an Honorary Research Fellow at the University of Glasgow between 1990 and 1991.

As well as numerous scholarly articles, he is widely published in the British broadsheet newspapers and has been an opera critic for Tribune.

Books
 Making Enemies, Palgrave Macmillan, 2007, 
 Legitimating Identities, Cambridge University Press, 2001, 
 Political Ideas and Political Action, Blackwell, 2000, 
 Political Ideas in Modern Britain, Routledge, 1997,

References

 Webpage at the Government Department, LSE
 Personal webpage
 Gresham College biography

Academics of the London School of Economics
Living people
Year of birth missing (living people)
Professors of Gresham College
British political scientists
Alumni of Downing College, Cambridge
Alumni of the London School of Economics
Academics of Swansea University